Countess of Cumberland may refer to:

Eleanor Clifford, Countess of Cumberland (1519-1547)
Margaret Clifford, Countess of Cumberland (1560–1616)